Dreams Football Club may refer to:
 Dreams F.C. (Ghana), an association football club in Ghana
 Dreams F.C. (Hong Kong), a professional association football club in Hong Kong